Bruce Guthrie is a senior Australian journalist and former newspaper and magazine editor.

In November 2008 he was sacked as editor-in-chief of Melbourne's Herald-Sun newspaper: he sued his employer, Rupert Murdoch's News Ltd, and won: the court battle and some of Guthrie's earlier career is reported in his 2010 book Man Bites Murdoch: Four Decades in Print, Six Days in Court.

Early life
Guthrie grew up in the working-class Melbourne suburb of Broadmeadows. He briefly attended university and was a public servant before starting as a copy boy on The Herald in 1972.

Career
Guthrie has been editor of The Sunday Age, The Age, the Herald Sun, Who Weekly, The Weekend Australian Magazine, and a senior editor at People Magazine in New York.

The New Daily
In 2013, Guthrie was the founding editor of the online newspaper The New Daily. As at the beginning of June 2019, Guthrie is the online paper's editorial director.

Court case
Guthrie sued News Ltd in the Supreme Court of Victoria in April 2010 for $2.7 million and after a six-day trial was awarded $580,808.

References

20th-century Australian journalists
Living people
Year of birth missing (living people)
Journalists from Melbourne
People from Broadmeadows, Victoria
21st-century Australian journalists